The 2012–13 snooker season was a series of snooker tournaments played between 16 May 2012 and 6 May 2013. The season featured two new ranking events: the Wuxi Classic and the International Championship. The tour had a record five ranking events in China, and three new PTC events in Asia. The tour also visited Bulgaria for the first time in its history, and returned to Poland, Belgium and Australia. Before the start of the season World Snooker requested every player to sign a players contract, that would allow players to choose which events they want to enter – no player was forced to play in any event. At the end of the season Mark Selby was named the World Snooker Player of the Year, the Snooker Writers' Player of the Year and the Fans' Player of the Year and Ian Burns the Rookie of the Year. Ronnie O'Sullivan received the "Performance of the Year" for winning his fifth World title after playing just one competitive match during the season. Jimmy Robertson's 57 break in just 130 seconds at the Snooker Shoot Out received the "Magic Moment of the Year" award. Terry Griffiths, Joe Johnson, Peter Ebdon, Ken Doherty, Graeme Dott, Shaun Murphy and Neil Robertson were inducted into the Hall of Fame.

The season had a total of £7.1 million of prize money. The World Championship, the UK Championship, the International Championship and the Masters were the four biggest tournaments in terms of prize money with the total pot being over half a million pounds at each event. A further £5,000 was on offer at the televised stages of each ranking event for any player who compiled a maximum break and this prize rolled over from one tournament to the next if not won. A £500 rolling prize was given to any player who completed the feat in the qualifying stages of ranking events. A separate £500 rolling prize was also available in all the PTC events, but this prize was excluded from the Asian PTCs. If at any tournament a 147 was made by more than one player, then the prize was equally shared.

New professional players
Countries
 
 
 
 
 
 
 
 
 
 
 
 
 

The 2012/2013 season was made up of 99 professional players. The top 64 players after the 2012 World Championships automatically qualified for the 2012/2013 season as did the top eight who were not in the top 64 from the Players Tour Championship Order of Merit. Another twelve places were available through Q School; the rest of the places on to the tour came from amateur events and national governing body nominations. All players except those in the top 64 received a tour card for two seasons. Listed below are the players who qualified for the 2012/2013 and 2013/2014 season.

IBSF World Snooker Championship winner:  Hossein Vafaei
IBSF World Under-21 Snooker Championship winner:  Thanawat Thirapongpaiboon
EBSA European Snooker Championships winner:  Scott Donaldson
EBSA European Under-21 Snooker Championships winner:  Michael Leslie
ACBS Asian Snooker Championship runner-up:  Pankaj Advani
ACBS Asian Under-21 Snooker Championship runner-up:  Zhang Anda

NGB nominations

Players Tour Championship Order of Merit

Calendar 
The following table outlines the results and dates for all the ranking and major invitational events.

Official rankings

Seeding revision 1

Seeding revision 2

Seeding revision 3

Seeding revision 4

Seeding revision 5

World ranking points

Points distribution 
2012/2013 points distribution for world ranking and minor-ranking events

Notes

References

External links

2012
Season 2013
Season 2012